"Polk Salad Annie" is a 1968 song written and performed by Tony Joe White. Its lyrics describe the lifestyle of a poor rural Southern girl and her family. Traditionally, the term to describe the type of food highlighted in the song is polk or poke salad, a cooked greens dish made from pokeweed. Its 1969 single release peaked at No. 8 on the Billboard Hot 100. In Canada, the song made No. 10 on the RPM Magazine Hot Singles chart. Elvis Presley's version also made the song popular.

Song
The song vividly recreates the Southern roots of White's childhood and his music reflects this earthy rural background. As a child he listened not only to local bluesmen and country singers but also to the Cajun music of Louisiana, the hybrid of traditional musical styles introduced by French settlers at the turn of the century.

His roots lie in the swamplands of Oak Grove, Louisiana, where he was born in 1943. Situated just west of the Mississippi River, it's a land of cottonfields, where pokeweed, or "poke" grows wild, and alligators lurk in moss-covered swamps. "I spent the first 18 years of my life down there", said White. "My folks raised cotton and corn. There were lotsa times when there weren't too much to eat, and I ain't ashamed to admit that we've often whipped up a mess of poke sallet. Tastes alright too — a bit like spinach." In the song, after gathering the leaves, Annie drags them home in a 'tote sack'.

In a January 17, 2014, interview with music journalist Ray Shasho, White explained the thought process behind the writing of "Polk Salad Annie" and "Rainy Night in Georgia".

Background
The single, released in 1969 by Monument Records, had been out nine months before it finally charted, and had been written off by Monument as a failure. Said White: "They had done given up on it, but we kept getting all these people in Texas coming to the clubs and buying the record. So we would send up to Nashville saying, 'Send us a thousand more this week.' They would send us these 'Do Not Sell' examples, so we would have to sit down and mark out the 'Do Not Sell' and then send them to the record stores. All these stores in South Texas kept calling our house saying, 'We need more.' So we just kept hanging on. And finally a guy in L.A. picked it up and got it across. Otherwise, 'Poke' could have been lost forever."

In 2014 White performed the song with Dave Grohl and the Foo Fighters on Late Show With David Letterman.

Personnel
Tony Joe White — vocals, guitar
Jerry Carrigan — drums
David Briggs — organ
Norbert Putnam — bass

Chart history

Weekly charts

Year-end charts

Elvis Presley cover
Elvis Presley picked up the song, and it became a staple of his live performances during the 1970s. Not a studio recording but his February 1970 live recording became the only version of "Polk Salad Annie" to chart in the UK and Ireland.

Chart history

Elvis' rendition was issued on several albums, including:
 On Stage (1970)
 Elvis: That's the Way it Is (documentary film, 1970).
 Elvis: As Recorded At Madison Square Garden (1972),
 Walk a Mile in My Shoes: The Essential '70s Masters (RCA Records),
 Elvis 75 (RCA Records),
 Best Of Artist Of The Century (RCA Records),
Though not on the Elvis Recorded Live on Stage in Memphis (1974) album, it was put on the legacy edition of that album in 2014; the song was performed at the concert from which the album was taken. From the Garden version on, it featured a rare fuzz bass solo by Jerry Scheff. Tony Joe White reportedly liked Presley's interpretation of the song.
(Refer to each album stated for citation)

Cover versions

Richard "Groove" Holmes, live, on his 1970 album Recorded Live at the Lighthouse
Clarence Reid on his 1969 album Dancin' With Nobody But You Babe
Tom Jones released a version on his 1970 album Tom, recorded in February 1970
White did a duet with Johnny Cash on the April 8, 1970, edition of The Johnny Cash Show. This performance has been released on DVD on The Best of the Johnny Cash Show. 
Los Lonely Boys on their 2009 tribute EP entitled 1969.
Conan O'Brien on his Legally Prohibited from Being Funny on Television Tour. He mentions that Presley sang the song on his tour as well.
Rockabilly artist Sleepy LaBeef on his album Rockabilly 1977; he also included it on his 2000 album Tomorrow Never Comes.
Johnny Hallyday did a live duet performance with White during his 1984 tour in Nashville.
American-born French singer Joe Dassin on his album, Blue Country, released in 1979.
Harald Schmidt on 9/13/2011 during his Late-Night-Show on German TV
Dutch Mason on his album Wish Me Luck (1979)
Big Twist and the Mellow Fellows on their 1983 album, Playing For Keeps.
Peabody instructor Gil Trythall on his electronic music album Nashville Gold (Switched on Moog).
Tony Joe White and Foo Fighters on the Late Show With David Letterman (Season 22, Episode 35), originally airing on October 15, 2014.
Jimmie Van Zant on his 2008 album My Name Is Jimmie.
The BossHoss on their album Stallion Battalion released in 2007
Dan Aykroyd and Jim Belushi have a version on their 2003 album Have Love Will Travel
A 1971 James Burton cover is featured in the 2019 movie Ford v Ferrari.

See also

Notes and references

External links
 

Swamp rock songs
Elvis Presley songs
Tom Jones (singer) songs
Tony Joe White songs
1968 songs
1969 singles
Songs written by Tony Joe White
Songs about poverty
Monument Records singles